Chen Hao (born 11 January 2002) is a Chinese professional footballer who currently plays as a midfielder for Hong Kong Premier League club Sham Shui Po.

Club career
Born in Guangzhou, Guangdong, Chen started playing football at the Haizhu District team while still in primary school. He joined Guangzhou City, before moving to Spain at the age of twelve to join the academy of Valencia, as part of the Wanda Group initiative to bring young Chinese players to Spanish clubs. In 2018, he transferred to Villarreal, after the Wanda Group terminated their deal with Valencia.

Due to the COVID-19 pandemic in Spain, Chen returned to Guangzhou, before moving to Hong Kong in November 2021.

In August 2022, Chen joined Hong Kong Premier League club Sham Shui Po.

International career
Chen is eligible to represent both China and Hong Kong at the international level, as his mother is from Hong Kong, and he has had a Hong Kong ID card since 2019.

Career statistics

Club
.

Notes

References

External links
 Chen Hao at the HKFA

2002 births
Living people
Footballers from Guangzhou
Footballers from Guangdong
Chinese footballers
Association football midfielders
Hong Kong First Division League players
Hong Kong Premier League players
Sham Shui Po SA players
Chinese expatriate footballers
Chinese expatriate sportspeople in Spain
Expatriate footballers in Spain